Matthew Richard Lucas (born 5 March 1974) is an English actor, comedian, writer, and television presenter. He is best known for his work with David Walliams on the BBC sketch comedy series Little Britain (2003–2006, 2020) and Come Fly with Me (2010–2011). Lucas first came to prominence on the comedy panel show Shooting Stars, in which he portrayed scorekeeper George Dawes from 1995 to 2009. From 2015 to 2017, Lucas portrayed the role of Nardole in the BBC series Doctor Who. He has also appeared in films, including Astro Boy (2009), Alice in Wonderland (2010), Bridesmaids (2011), Gnomeo & Juliet (2011), Small Apartments (2012), and Paddington (2014). Lucas presented The Great British Bake Off, alongside Noel Fielding from 2020 to 2023.

Early life
Matthew Richard Lucas was born on 5 March 1974 in the Paddington area of London, the son of Diana (née Williams; born 1945) and chauffeuring business owner John Stanley Lucas (1944–1996). His family is Jewish; some of his mother's family fled Nazi Germany just before the Second World War. He was raised in a Reform Jewish although his parents came from Orthodox Jewish families. He has had alopecia since childhood, before he lost all of his hair at the age of 6 in 1980. When Lucas was 22, his father died of a heart attack at the age of 52.

Lucas was educated at Aylward Primary School and Haberdashers' Boys' School in Borehamwood, Hertfordshire. He studied drama at the University of Bristol between 1992 and 1995, although he did not complete his degree. He also spent time with the National Youth Theatre, where he met his future collaborator David Walliams.

Career

Early work
Lucas's association with Vic Reeves and Bob Mortimer began in 1992. He appeared in The Smell of Reeves and Mortimer in 1995, and went on to star with them in Shooting Stars. He quickly rose to fame as George Dawes, a giant baby (often dressed in an adult-sized romper suit) who would deliver a string of meaningless gags and insults before delivering the teams' scores, while sitting at and playing a drum kit. He also appeared on occasion as Marjorie Dawes, George's mother, who also appears in Little Britain.

He again appeared with Reeves & Mortimer in the BBC TV series Randall & Hopkirk (Deceased) and Catterick, in a variety of roles. In 1999, Lucas paired with David Walliams, with whom he had already worked in Mash and Peas and Sir Bernard's Stately Homes, to create Rock Profile, a comedy show spoofing famous musical personalities. It is notable for being one of their first comedic collaborations.

His music video appearances include the Damien Hirst-directed video for Blur's "Country House," "Jesusland" by Ben Folds in 2005, "I'm with Stupid" by Pet Shop Boys, and "Vindaloo" by Fat Les.

Lucas ventured into stage musicals in 2002, when he took a role in Boy George's musical Taboo at The Venue in London. He played the performance artist Leigh Bowery.

Little Britain
Little Britain is Lucas' most commercially successful work. The show came about when trainee BBC radio producer Ashley Blaker, tasked with coming up with ideas for a television or radio series, bumped into Lucas in London. The two were old friends from Haberdashers' and Lucas took Blaker to the Groucho Club, where he told Blaker of his ideas for a sketch show. Little Britain was launched as a radio show on BBC Radio 4 and it later became a TV series.

Among the many characters he plays in the series, which he writes and acts in along with David Walliams, are apparently "disabled" Andy Pipkin, teenage Bristol chav Vicky Pollard, homophobic homosexual Daffyd Thomas, and insensitive slimming club organiser Marjorie Dawes.

In January 2005, Lucas and Walliams were named the most powerful people in TV comedy by Radio Times.

Later career
In 2005, he took his first role in a television drama, a supporting part as a Venetian duke in the BBC historical serial Casanova, written by Russell T Davies. Also in 2005, he did voice work in the ITV children's program King Arthur's Disasters alongside Rik Mayall. Since 2006, Lucas has been the voice of the radio and television character Digit Al, devised as part of a public information campaign on digital switchover. On 26 November 2006 he appeared on the BBC Radio 4 programme Desert Island Discs. He made a cameo appearance in Shaun of the Dead as Tom, the cousin of Shaun's friend Yvonne.

In 2007, he released "I'm Gonna Be", originally by The Proclaimers, with Peter Kay as a charity single for Comic Relief. He performed the single as Little Britain character Andy Pipkin, along with Kay playing as Brian Potter. He also starred as Mr. Toad in The Wind in the Willows, a 2006 television adaptation of the Kenneth Grahame novel.

He has appeared in Kath & Kim and Neighbours (the latter alongside David Walliams as Little Britain characters Lou and Andy), as well as a cameo role, playing 'Chris' or 'Jammy' at the wedding fayre, in the BBC Three sitcom Gavin & Stacey. Lucas has co-written (with Walliams) and performed in a new series of Little Britain USA for HBO. Lucas was the first celebrity to appear in 2008's Big Brother Celebrity Hijack on E4.

On 9 April 2009, the series Kröd Mändoon and the Flaming Sword of Fire, featuring Lucas as a regular performer, premièred on Comedy Central, the first major comedy series which Lucas had worked on since Little Britain. In 2010, Lucas played Tweedledee and Tweedledum in Tim Burton's Alice in Wonderland.

Starting in February 2010, Lucas began hosting his own radio show, And The Winner Is, in which he handed out a fictional series of awards based on nominations by his guests.

On 3 October 2010, Lucas played Thénardier in the 25th Anniversary Concerts of Les Misérables, at the O2 Arena in London. A year later, from 23 June to 10 September 2011, he reprised the role at the Queen's Theatre, in the West End. He has since collaborated with Alfie Boe, who played Jean Valjean, to record a duet of "The Impossible Dream" on Boe's debut album.

Also in 2011, Lucas lent his voice to the CGI film Gnomeo and Juliet and he played a small role as the roommate of Kristen Wiig in the comedy Bridesmaids.

On Christmas Day 2010, the BBC began showing Lucas and David Walliams' new series, Come Fly with Me. The show saw Walliams and Lucas each playing multiple characters but, unlike Little Britain, it focused entirely on the working environment of the airline industry. In an interview shown on BBC 3 on 9 February 2011, it was stated that the creators considered bringing travel agent character Carol Beer from Little Britain to the new series, but decided against it, as they did not want viewers to see the new show as merely a spinoff. Instead, all new characters were introduced.

On 28 March 2012, Lucas appeared as the "Generation X" guest on the Australian game show Talkin' 'Bout Your Generation. On 10 April 2012, Lucas's own BBC One show The Matt Lucas Awards began. It was a send-up of an awards program, with a panel of comedians giving their nominations for awards for a series of prizes concerning trivial topics.

Lucas also starred in the dark comedy Small Apartments released in February 2013 alongside James Caan, Billy Crystal, Johnny Knoxville, and Juno Temple with other cameo performances by notable actors. On 21 February 2013, Lucas appeared on the NBC series Community as Toby, an English friend of Abed Nadir. In 2014, Lucas played Ray Thomas in The Life of Rock with Brian Pern.

Lucas launched a new comedy series called Pompidou for BBC Two. The show began airing on 1 March 2015.

In May 2016, Lucas reprised his role as "Tweedledee/Tweedledum" in Tim Burton's Alice Through the Looking Glass, sequel to Alice in Wonderland. Lucas joined the BBC series Doctor Who for its tenth series, reprising the character Nardole, which he had previously played in the 2015 and 2016 Christmas specials, "The Husbands of River Song" and "The Return of Doctor Mysterio" respectively.

On 16 February 2017, Lucas was awarded an Honorary Degree "Doctor of Letters" by the University of Bristol, where he had studied for two years in the 1990s but had left before completing his degree course. On 3 October 2017, Lucas released his autobiography titled Little Me, published by Canongate Books in hardback. The paperback edition was released on 7 June 2018.

From 2 July to 25 August 2018, Lucas played Bill Snibson in a revival of Me and My Girl at Chichester Festival Theatre.

In 2019, Lucas was the bank holiday cover host for the Radio 2 Breakfast Show. He will also cover Paul O'Grady's Sunday 5–7pm show during the summer; Fearne Cotton will be the main holiday cover host.
In 2021, Lucas continues to sit in for Zoe Ball and host the Radio 2 Breakfast Show.

From 10 August to 30 November 2019, Lucas appeared in Les Misérables at the Gielgud Theatre in London's West End, playing the role of Monsieur Thénardier in a fully staged concert adaptation of the musical. On 20 December 2019, Lucas returned to the role at the Sondheim Theatre, after actor Gerard Carey contracted vocal damage through pneumonia and was forced to pull out. On 10 January 2020, Lucas himself was forced to withdraw from the show following a back injury.

In March 2020, he became the new co-host of the Channel 4 and Love Productions television show The Great British Bake Off, taking over from Sandi Toksvig. He departed from the programme in December 2022.

On 3 April 2020, Lucas released a reworked version of his "Baked Potato Song" from Shooting Stars titled "Thank You Baked Potato", with all proceeds from the track going towards the Feed NHS campaign, which aims to provide meals for NHS workers in the midst of the COVID-19 pandemic in the UK. The song reached No. 34 in the charts. Lucas also wrote a children's picture book based on "Thank You, Baked Potato", published by Egmont and all proceeds again go to Feed NHS.

In 2020, Lucas, along with his Little Britain co-star David Walliams, apologized for their portrayal of characters using racial caricatures, "including an obese Caribbean woman called Desiree DeVere, portrayed in blackface, and a 'portly Thai bride' called Ting Tong." This was prompted after Netflix and BBC iPlayer removed the show from their catalogues.

Personal life
Lucas is a patron of the Karen Morris Memorial Trust, a UK charity for leukaemia patients and their families. In April 2003, he appeared on Celebrity Who Wants to Be a Millionaire? and won £62,500 for the charity.

Lucas is gay. He first suspected his sexuality at age seven. At a ceremony in Central London in December 2006, he entered into a civil partnership with Kevin McGee. In attendance were Barbara Windsor, Neil Tennant, Elton John, and Courtney Love. They separated and had their civil partnership dissolved through the High Court in 2008.

Lucas was raised as Jewish but has variously described himself as an atheist and a "fairly secular Jew". On 16 June 2022, he was the subject of BBC's Who Do You Think You Are? and discovered that many of his grandmother's cousins had been killed in the Holocaust. His grandmother's cousin Werner Goldschmidt rented a room from Otto Frank, in Amsterdam in 1942, and was living with the family when they went into hiding. In 2021, 83 years after his grandmother fled Berlin, Lucas obtained German citizenship and collected a Certificate of Naturalisation from the German embassy.

Lucas is an avid supporter of Arsenal Football Club.

From 2012 to 2015, Lucas lived with his Bridesmaids co-star Rebel Wilson in West Hollywood.

Acting roles

Films

Television

Shorts

Web videos

Audio dramas

Theatre

Bibliography

References

External links

Matt Lucas at the British Film Institute

1974 births
Living people
20th-century British writers
20th-century English comedians
20th-century English male actors
20th-century English LGBT people
21st-century British writers
21st-century English comedians
21st-century English male actors
21st-century English LGBT people
Alumni of the University of Bristol
Audiobook narrators
Best Comedy Performance BAFTA Award (television) winners
British atheists
British gay writers
British male comedy actors
British male film actors
British male television writers
British sketch comedians
Charly Records artists
English atheists
English comedy writers
English expatriates in the United States
English gay actors
English male comedians
English male film actors
English male television actors
English male voice actors
English people of German-Jewish descent
English radio presenters
English television presenters
English television producers
English television writers
Gay comedians
Jewish English male actors
Jewish atheists
British LGBT broadcasters
British LGBT comedians
British LGBT screenwriters
British LGBT singers
English LGBT writers
Little Britain
Male actors from London
National Youth Theatre members
People educated at Haberdashers' Boys' School
People from Paddington
People from Stanmore
People with alopecia universalis
Smash Records artists